The Reese's Cup Classic was a golf tournament on the Nationwide Tour from 1997 to 2004. It was played at the Hershey Country Club, East Course, in Hershey, Pennsylvania. It was played as the Hershey Open from 1997 to 2002.

Winners

Bolded golfers graduated to the PGA Tour via the final Nationwide Tour money list.

References

Former Korn Ferry Tour events
Golf in Pennsylvania
Recurring sporting events established in 1997
Recurring sporting events disestablished in 2004
1997 establishments in Pennsylvania
2004 disestablishments in Pennsylvania